Oliver Szymanski (born 27 July 1990) is a German sailor who specializes in the 470 (dinghy) class. He represented Germany, along with partner Ferdinand Gerz, in men's 470 class at the 2016 Summer Olympics in Rio de Janeiro. They finished in 11th place.

References 

1990 births
Living people
German male sailors (sport)
Olympic sailors of Germany
Sailors at the 2016 Summer Olympics – 470